Kim Heiduk (born 3 March 2000) is a German cyclist, who currently rides for UCI WorldTeam .

Major results
2017
 3rd Road race, National Junior Road Championships
2018
 3rd Overall Ain Bugey Valromey Tour
2021
 1st  Road race, National Under-23 Road Championships
 2nd Overall Tour d'Eure-et-Loir
1st Stage 1
 2nd Overall Orlen Nations Grand Prix
 2nd Gippinger Radsporttage 
 4th Ster van Zwolle
 4th Overall International Tour of Rhodes
2023
 7th Per sempre Alfredo
 7th Schwalbe Classic

References

External links

2000 births
Living people
German male cyclists
People from Herrenberg
Sportspeople from Stuttgart (region)
Cyclists from Baden-Württemberg
21st-century German people